Stones Throw Records is an American independent record label based in Los Angeles, California. Under the direction of founder Peanut Butter Wolf, Stones Throw has released music ranging from hip hop to experimental psychedelic rock. LA Weekly deemed the label an "eternally evolving experiment" in celebration of its 20th anniversary.

History
Chris Manak, known professionally as Peanut Butter Wolf, founded Stones Throw in 1996 as a means of releasing music he had recorded previously with the subsequently deceased rapper Charles Edward Hicks Jr., known professionally as Charizma. Hicks and Manak met in 1989 at 16 and 19, respectively, and began collaborating as Charizma and Peanut Butter Wolf. The duo released one promo cassette of "Red Light Green Light" through Hollywood Basic—the now-defunct hip-hop subsidiary of Hollywood Records—before leaving the label. Their collaboration was cut short in 1993, when Hicks was fatally shot in a carjacking at the age of 20. Stones Throw's first release, "My World Premiere" by Charizma and Peanut Butter Wolf, arrived three years later.

The label has released hip hop records including Madvillainy, the acclaimed debut from Madvillain (a collaboration between producer Madlib and MF Doom) in 2004, and J Dilla's Donuts in 2006. In 2014, a documentary entitled Our Vinyl Weighs a Ton: This is Stones Throw Records was released. The film, directed by Jeff Broadway, historicizes the label's evolution, from the initial collaboration between Hicks and Manak to Stones Throw's influence on mainstream hip hop. Artists such as Kanye West and Questlove appear in the documentary and offer testimonials.

In February 2018, it was announced that North Carolina based Redeye Distribution would become the distributor for Stones Throw.

Artists

See also 
 List of record labels
 Underground hip hop

References

External links

Discography

American independent record labels
Record labels established in 1996
Hip hop record labels